The Gazzola and Vaccaro Building is a historic commercial building at 131–133 West Cypress in Brinkley, Arkansas.  It is a two-story brick structure, with a flat roof fronted by a broad curved parapet.  The horizontal banding of windows and decorative elements above are indicators of the Prairie School of design.  The building was designed by architect Charles L. Thompson and completed in 1916; it is an imposing presence and the small city's most sophisticated architectural building.

The building was listed on the National Register of Historic Places in 1982.

See also
National Register of Historic Places listings in Monroe County, Arkansas

References

Commercial buildings on the National Register of Historic Places in Arkansas
Prairie School architecture in Arkansas
Commercial buildings completed in 1916
Buildings and structures in Monroe County, Arkansas
National Register of Historic Places in Monroe County, Arkansas